Angelo Iannelli (born 27 July 1976) is an Italian retired male long-distance runner and steeplechase runner, who competed at the 2003 World Championships in Athletics.

Biography
During his career he won a medal in a Continental competitions, in Florence at the 2003 European Cup Super League.

Achievements

References

External links
 

1976 births
Living people
Italian male steeplechase runners
World Athletics Championships athletes for Italy
Athletics competitors of Fiamme Azzurre